Oussama Nabil (born 18 February 1996) is a Moroccan runner who specializes in the 800 metres.

In the 800 metres he finished sixth at the 2013 World Youth Championships won the gold medal at the 2017 Jeux de la Francophonie, the gold medal at the 2017 Arab Championships, finished fourth at the 2017 Islamic Solidarity Games and won the bronze medal at the 2019 African Games.

He also competed at the 2014 World Junior Championships (1500 m) without reaching the final, placed lowly at the 2015 World Cross Country Championships and was disqualified in the semi-final at the 2019 World Championships

At the 2020 Summer Olympics, he competed in the men's 800 metres event. 

His personal best times are 1:45.42 minutes in the 800 metres, achieved at the 2019 African Games in Rabat; and 3:37.08 minutes in the 1500 metres, achieved in July 2017 in Bruay-la-Buissiere.

References

External links
 
 
 
 

1996 births
Living people
Moroccan male middle-distance runners
Athletes (track and field) at the 2019 African Games
African Games bronze medalists for Morocco
World Athletics Championships athletes for Morocco
African Games medalists in athletics (track and field)
Athletes (track and field) at the 2020 Summer Olympics
Olympic athletes of Morocco
20th-century Moroccan people
21st-century Moroccan people